This is a list of lighthouses in Montenegro.

Lighthouses

See also
 Lists of lighthouses and lightvessels

References

External links

 Maritime Safety Department of Montenegro
 

Montenegro
Lighthouses
Lighthouses